Eringa Station is a pastoral lease that operates as a cattle station in the outback of South Australia, once owned by Sir Sidney Kidman. Its land is gazetted as a locality called Eringa in 2013.

The area is hilly and has a better average rainfall than much of the surrounding country. The rarely dry waterhole, the Eringa waterhole, was once situated within the boundaries of the station.

History
Established at some time prior to 1879 it was owned by Arthur Treloar and J. J. Duncan, with Treloar managing the property. By 1886 Eringa was stocked with 4,000 head of cattle and 150 horses.

The  property was acquired in 1899 by Sidney Kidman, in the same year he also acquired Austral Downs and Carcoory Stations. Kidman named his his home in Kapunda, which he acquired around 1900, after this property.

The area had excellent rains in 1910 with over  being recorded over a few days with creeks in the area all flooding.
In 1955 the  station was being managed by Mr. W. L. Franklin and was running 5,000 head of cattle.

The station buildings are now derelict and the leasehold is part of the  Hamilton Station.

The land occupying the extent of the Eringa Station pastoral lease was gazetted as a locality in April 2013 under the name "Eringa".

See also
List of ranches and stations

References

Pastoral leases in South Australia
Stations (Australian agriculture)
Far North (South Australia)